Iganzo is an administrative ward in the Mbeya Urban district of the Mbeya Region of Tanzania. In 2016 the Tanzania National Bureau of Statistics report there were 15,886 people in the ward, from 14,414 in 2012.

Neighborhoods 
The ward has 4 neighborhoods.
 Iganzo
 Igodima
 Mwambenja
 Nkuyu

References 

Wards of Mbeya Region